SITEX Corporation was founded in 1961 and is a provider of uniform and linen services, mats, mops, custom apparel, promotional items, screen-printing, embroidery, first aid, and restroom hygiene services in Kentucky, Indiana, Tennessee, and Illinois. SITEX is under the management of Wes and Jon Sights marking the third generation of Sight family members to operate in the laundry industry.

Impact on Kentucky
Jon Sights is the former chair of the Western Kentucky Regional Industrial Development since its inception in 1998. In October 2014, U.S. Representative Ed Whitfield and state Representative Suzanne Miles used SITEX's location in Kentucky as one of their stops while on their bus tour around Kentucky.

History
James and Gladys Sights of Henderson, Kentucky founded SITEX Corporation on January 1, 1961, known then as Industrial Uniform Services, Incorporated. With Rental Uniform, Inc. the organization reached into Southwest Kentucky, West Tennessee, Southeast Missouri, and Southern Illinois. During that same period, the Sights family established the operating name Sani-Clean Linen & Uniform Service as a "doing-business-as" (DBA) for Industrial Uniform Service to reflect their expanded offerings.

In August 1995, the Sights family decided to change the business and official name to SITEX Corporation, with "SITEX" being short for Sights Textiles. 
In 2003, SITEX worked with J.E. Shekell to build a 72,000 square foot laundry facility in Henderson, Kentucky. Hart's Rental Uniform Services, LLC became part of SITEX in December 2008.

References

External links

 SITEX Corporate website

Companies based in Kentucky
Business services companies established in 1961
Clothing companies established in 1961
1961 establishments in Kentucky
Clothing companies of the United States
Business services companies of the United States
Henderson, Kentucky